Lieutenant-General (retd) Munir Hafiez (born March 1949) is a retired Pakistan Army general and the former chairman of the National Accountability Bureau (NAB) of the Government of Pakistan. Before his appointment in 2001, he served in the Pakistani Army for 38 years.

Military career 
Hafiez was commissioned in the 39th PMA Long Course in October 1969. He also stayed GOC 7th Infantry Division at Peshawar and as Commander, XXXI Corps at Bahawalpur from August 2000 to October 2001.

NAB chairman
He was replaced by Lt. Gen. Shahid Aziz after completing a controversial four-year tenure at NAB from October 2001 to October 2005.

Later work
He has served as managing director and CEO of Fauji Fertilizer Company Limited. He has also served as Vice President of Zindagi Trust, a private organization.

References

External links
Speech to the International Institute for Strategic Studies

Pakistani generals
1949 births
Living people
Frontier Force Regiment officers
Army Burn Hall College alumni